The Cathedral of Saint Jude the Apostle is a Roman Catholic cathedral located in St. Petersburg, Florida, United States.  It is the seat of the Diocese of St. Petersburg. St. Jude Parish was founded in 1950.  The first church building, now Our Lady's Chapel, was completed the following year.  As the parish grew larger a combination school and church building was completed in 1954.  The present church building, a Modern interpretation of the Byzantine style in the form of a Latin cross, was built in 1963.  When Pope Paul VI established the Diocese of Petersburg on March 2, 1968, it became the cathedral of the new diocese. The cathedral underwent a $9 million renovation from 2012 to 2013.

See also
List of Catholic cathedrals in the United States
List of cathedrals in Florida

References

External links

Cathedral website
Diocese of St. Petersburg Website

Christian organizations established in 1950
Roman Catholic churches completed in 1963
Roman Catholic Diocese of Saint Petersburg
Jude the Apostle, Saint, St. Petersburg
Roman Catholic churches in Florida
Churches in St. Petersburg, Florida
Modernist architecture in Florida
Churches in Pinellas County, Florida
1950 establishments in Florida
20th-century Roman Catholic church buildings in the United States